Nomada superba is a species of nomad bee in the family Apidae. It is found in North America.

Subspecies
These two subspecies belong to the species Nomada superba:
 Nomada superba malvastri Swenk, 1913
 Nomada superba superba Cresson, 1863

References

Further reading

External links

 

Nomadinae
Articles created by Qbugbot
Insects described in 1863